Octane is the eighth studio album by American progressive rock band Spock's Beard, released on 25 January 2005. The first seven tracks form a complete piece of work, "A Flash Before My Eyes", that tells the story of a man involved in a car accident who relives his memories in the moments following the crash.

A special edition release contained a second disc which contained five new tracks, outtakes from "A Flash Before My Eyes" and a video documenting the making of the album.

Critical reception

With Octane, the band continued on a similar path as Feel Euphoria with a shift from progressive rock to a more straight-ahead rock sound. As a result, Octane has received generally average reviews since its release.

Track listing

Sources:

Personnel
Spock's Beard
Nick D'Virgilio – lead vocals, drums, percussion, loops, electric guitar and acoustic guitar
Alan Morse – guitar, theremin, saw, backing vocals
Ryo Okumoto – keyboards
Dave Meros –  bass

Additional musicians
Eric Gorfain – violin
Daphne Chen – violin
Leah Katz – viola
Richard Dodd – cello
Gina Ballina – French horn
Johnnie Corno – French horn
Ramón Flores – trumpet

Additional credits
Stan Ausmus – songwriting
John Boegehold – songwriting, string and horn arrangement
Rich Mouser – mixing
Jay Frigoletto – mastering
Thomas Ewerhard – artwork

References

2005 albums
Spock's Beard albums
Inside Out Music albums